Ali Nail Durmuş (born 20 November 1970) is a retired Turkish football midfielder and later manager.

He was a squad member for the 1991 Mediterranean Games.

References

1970 births
Living people
Turkish footballers
Bursaspor footballers
Fenerbahçe S.K. footballers
Vanspor footballers
Zeytinburnuspor footballers
Göztepe S.K. footballers
MKE Kırıkkalespor footballers
Tekirdağspor footballers
Kahramanmaraşspor footballers
Association football midfielders
Turkey youth international footballers
Turkey under-21 international footballers
Competitors at the 1991 Mediterranean Games
Turkish football managers
Zeytinburnuspor managers
People from Akyazı
Mediterranean Games competitors for Turkey